Amblyopappus is a genus of flowering plants in the family Asteraceae described as a genus in 1841.

There is only one known species, Amblyopappus pusillus, known by the common name dwarf coastweed. This plant is native to Baja California in Mexico and the coast of Southern California in the United States. It can also be found on the west coast of Chile and Peru in South America.

Amblyopappus pusillus is an aromatic annual herb with an erect stem up to 40 centimeters in height. The stem turns dark red with age. It is covered in narrow fleshy leaves and each small branch of the stem is topped with an inflorescence of one to several rounded budlike yellow flowers. The bracts are green, often with reddish edges.

References

External links 
Jepson Manual Treatment
United States Department of Agriculture Plants Profile
Calphotos Photo gallery, University of California

Madieae
Monotypic Asteraceae genera
Flora of California
Flora of Baja California
Flora of western South America
Natural history of the California Coast Ranges
Natural history of the Santa Monica Mountains
Plants described in 1836
Taxa named by William Jackson Hooker